Heterochroma is a genus of moths of the family Noctuidae. The genus was erected by Achille Guenée in 1852.

Species
 Heterochroma albipuncta E. D. Jones, 1908
 Heterochroma amphion (Druce, 1889)
 Heterochroma bellona (Felder, 1874)
 Heterochroma berylloides Hampson, 1908
 Heterochroma beryllus (Guenée, 1852)
 Heterochroma celestina Schaus, 1921
 Heterochroma chlorographa Hampson, 1908
 Heterochroma eriopioides Guenée, 1852
 Heterochroma exundata Schaus, 1911
 Heterochroma hadenoides Guenée, 1852
 Heterochroma hypatia (Druce, 1889)
 Heterochroma insignis (Walker, 1857)
 Heterochroma ligata Schaus, 1911
 Heterochroma lineata (Druce, 1898)
 Heterochroma luma (Druce, 1889)
 Heterochroma metallica (H. Edwards, 1884)
 Heterochroma quadrata (Dognin, 1910)
 Heterochroma rollia Schaus, 1921
 Heterochroma sarepta (Druce, 1889)
 Heterochroma singularis (Butler, 1879)
 Heterochroma thermeola Hampson, 1911
 Heterochroma thermida Hampson, 1908
 Heterochroma thermographa Hampson, 1910
 Heterochroma viridipicta Schaus, 1911

References

 
 

Hadeninae